The Burlington County Institute of Technology Westampton Campus is a four-year countywide vocational-technical public high school serving students in ninth through twelfth grades from Burlington County, New Jersey, United States, as part of the Burlington County Institute of Technology. Located in Westampton, the campus is one of two high schools in the district, along with the Medford campus.

As of the 2021–22 school year, the school had an enrollment of 1,254 students and 84.3 classroom teachers (on an FTE basis), for a student–teacher ratio of 14.9:1. There were 274 students (21.9% of enrollment) eligible for free lunch and 95 (7.6% of students) eligible for reduced-cost lunch.

Athletics
The BCIT Westampton Panthers compete in the Burlington County Scholastic League, an athletic conference comprised of public and public high schools located in Burlington County and the surrounding counties that operates under the aegis of the New Jersey State Interscholastic Athletic Association (NJSIAA). With 938 students in grades 10-12, the school was classified by the NJSIAA for the 2019–20 school year as Group III for most athletic competition purposes, which included schools with an enrollment of 761 to 1,058 students in that grade range.

Administration
The school's principal is Joseph Venuto. His administration team includes three assistant principals.

Notable alumni
 Ant Clemons, singer-songwriter, who released his debut album Happy 2 Be Here in March 2020.

References

External links
Burlington County Institute of Technology Westampton Campus

School Data for Burlington County Institute of Technology, National Center for Education Statistics
Westampton Campus Alumni

Public high schools in Burlington County, New Jersey
Vocational schools in New Jersey
Westampton Township, New Jersey